Kerrelyn Sparks is an American author of paranormal romance novels, best known for the Love at Stake series, currently comprising 17 novels. Each title in the Love at Stake series has become a USA Today bestseller, and she reached The New York Times Best Seller list with The Undead Next Door, the fourth in the series. Her books are currently published under Avon Books.

Biography 

Kerrelyn was a tap dancer and then a high school French teacher before turning her creative bent to writing. She lives in the Greater Houston area with her husband and children.

Bibliography

Love at Stake 
 How to Marry a Millionaire Vampire (2005)
 Vamps and The City (2006)
 Be Still My Vampire Heart (2007)
 The Undead Next Door (2008)
 All I Want for Christmas is a Vampire (2008)
 Secret Life of a Vampire (2009)
 Forbidden Nights with a Vampire (2009)
 The Vampire and The Virgin (2010)
 Eat Prey Love (2010)
 Vampire Mine (2011)
 Sexiest Vampire Alive (2011)
 Wanted: Undead or Alive (2012)
 Wild About You (2012)
 The Vampire with the Dragon Tattoo (2013)
 How to Seduce a Vampire (Without Really Trying) (2014)
 Crouching Tiger, Forbidden Vampire (2014)

The Embraced 
 How to Tame a Beast in Seven Days (2017)
 So I Married a Sorcerer (2017)
 Eight Simple Rules for Dating a Dragon (2018)

Historical Romance 
 For Love or Country (2002)
 Less Than a Gentleman (2013)

Anthologies 
A Very Vampy Christmas in Sugarplums and Scandal (2006) with Lori Avocato, Dana Cameron, Mary Dahiem, Suzanne Macpherson, and Cait London. Part of the Love at Stake series
V is for Vamp Woman in Vampires Gone Wild (2006) with Pamela Palmer, Amanda Arista, and Kim Falconer. Part of the Love at Stake series
V is for Vamp Woman in It Happened One Valentine's Day: An Avon Romance Valentine's Day Sampler (2013) with Eloisa James, Lynsay Sands, Janiene Frost, Liz Carlyle, Pamela Palmer, Rachel Gibson, and Emma Cane. Part of the Love at Stake series

Notes

External links
 Kerrelyn Sparks' Official website

Living people
21st-century American novelists
American romantic fiction writers
American women novelists
Year of birth missing (living people)
21st-century American women writers
American paranormal romance writers